Moringen is a town in the district Northeim, in the southern part of Lower Saxony, Germany. The town consists of the center Moringen and eight surrounding villages, Fredelsloh being one of them.

History
The town and its villages were founded over a thousand years ago.
It is the seat of a psychiatric hospital, founded in late 19th century. During WWII the hospital was emptied and used by the Nazis as the Moringen concentration camp. Today it is again a psychiatric hospital.

Economy
Among the larger firms operating in the community is Piller, a maker of industrial fans.  The Northeim district's major waste Landfill is in Moringen.

Museum
house KZ Gedenkstätte
historic gas holder

Literature

 The Women's Camp in Moringen: A Memoir of Imprisonment in Nazi Germany 1936-1937
by Gabriele Herz (Author), Jane Caplan (Editor), Hildegard Herz (Translator), Howard Hartig (Translator). Berghahn Books (15 Nov 2005).  ; .

See also
Lutterbeck

References

External links
 Official site 
 Website of the concentration camp memorial
 Website of Moringen Fire Department 

Northeim (district)